Ochrodota grisescens is a moth of the subfamily Arctiinae first described by Hervé de Toulgoët in 1999. It is found in French Guiana.

References

Phaegopterina